High School is an American coming-of-age drama streaming television series developed by Clea DuVall and Tegan and Sara Quin, based on the 2019 memoir of the same name by the Quins. It premiered on Amazon Freevee on October 14, 2022.

Premise
Through a backdrop of '90s grunge and rave culture, twin sisters navigate identity, love, and music.

Cast

Main
 Railey Gilliland as Tegan
 Seazynn Gilliland as Sara
 Esther McGregor as Natalie
 Olivia Rouyre as Phoebe
 Amanda Fix as Maya
 Brianne Tju as Ali
 Geena Meszaros as Lily

Recurring
 Cobie Smulders as Simone
 Kyle Bornheimer as Patrick
 Jayne Eastwood as June
 Nikki Rae Hallow as Loni
 Nate Corddry as David

Episodes

Production

Development
On October 20, 2020, it was announced that Amazon Studios's free ad-supported streaming service IMDb TV was developing a project based on identical twin indie pop duo Tegan and Sara Quin's eponymous 2019 memoir. Happiest Season director Clea DuVall was attached to create and direct the pilot episode, as well as executive produce alongside the Quin sisters. The series is set to be produced by Plan B Entertainment under their overall deal at Amazon Studios. At Amazon's first NewFront presentation on May 3, 2021, it was announced that IMDb TV had given the project a series order. Upon the series order announcement, Tegan and Sara said:

Casting
On March 17, 2022, Railey and Seazynn Gilliland were cast as the leads, while Cobie Smulders and Kyle Bornheimer were set to guest star in the show.

Filming
On March 17, 2022, it was reported that principal photography was set to begin on March 21 in Alberta, Canada.

Reception
In advance of its official Amazon premiere, the series received a preview screening in the Primetime program at the 2022 Toronto International Film Festival.

The review aggregator website Rotten Tomatoes reported a 100% approval rating with an average rating of 7.4/10, based on 22 critic reviews. The website's critics consensus reads, "High School is as effervescent and sensitive as a Tegan and Sara album, delivering a highly specific coming of age comedy that rings with universal truth." 

Metacritic gave the series a weighted average score of 82 out of 100 based on 10 critic reviews, indicating "universal acclaim."

On Rolling Stone's list of the 20 Best TV Shows of 2022, it was named as the 7th Best. 

On The New York Times list of Best TV Shows 2022, the show was listed 5th.

References

External links
 
 High School on Amazon Prime Video

2022 American television series debuts
2020s American drama television series
2020s American high school television series
2020s American LGBT-related drama television series
Coming-of-age television shows
English-language television shows
Television series about sisters
Television series about teenagers
Television series based on actual events
Television series based on singers and musicians
Television series by Amazon Studios
Television shows based on non-fiction books
Television shows filmed in Calgary
Television shows set in Calgary
Television series set in the 1990s
Tegan and Sara